Dalton Airport may refer to:

 Dalton Airport (Michigan) in Flushing, Michigan, United States (FAA: 3DA)
 Dalton Municipal Airport in Dalton, Georgia, United States (FAA: DNN)